"A School Story" is a ghost story by British writer  M. R. James, included in his collection More Ghost Stories of an Antiquary.

Plot summary
Two men are discussing the folklore of the private schools they attended. One tells of a Latin teacher named Mr. Sampson who kept a Byzantine coin that he would show his students. The narrator's friend gives the teacher a strange message in Latin which translates to "remember the well among the four yews", though he doesn't know why he wrote it. Later another paper shows up translating to "If you don't come to me, I'll come to you", and it visibly worries Sampson. Later at night the narrator's friend sees a man sitting on Sampson's window-sill, but when he returns with the narrator he's gone. Sampson is missing the next day. Years later a body is found - with Sampson's coin - in a well that sits between four trees.

References

External links

 

Full text of "A School Story"
A Podcast to the Curious: Episode 9 - A School Story
Cast of Wonders: Episode 172 - A School Story

1911 short stories
Short stories by M. R. James
Horror short stories